Hakea is a genus of about 150 species of plants in the Family Proteaceae, endemic to Australia. They are shrubs or small trees with leaves that are sometimes flat, otherwise circular in cross section in which case they are sometimes divided. The flowers are usually arranged in groups in leaf axils and resemble those of other genera, especially Grevillea. Hakeas have woody fruit which distinguishes them from grevilleas which have non-woody fruit which release the seeds as they mature. Hakeas are found in every state of Australia with the highest species diversity being found in the south west of Western Australia.

Description
Plants in the genus Hakea are shrubs or small trees. Some species have flat leaves, whilst others have leaves which are needle-like, in which case they are sometimes divided and sometimes have a groove on the lower surface. The flowers are arranged in groups in leaf axils and are surrounded by bracts when in bud. The flowers have both male and female parts and are borne on a short stalk called a pedicel. The sepals and petals, jointly called tepals, form a curved tube which sometimes splits open as the flower develops. The style is longer than the tepal tube and is curved before its tip is released. When released, the tip of the style is a pollen-presenter. The fruit of hakeas is woody and persists on the plant until burned in a bushfire or until the plant dies. The fruit then splits open to release two winged seeds.

Hakeas are similar to other plants in the Family Proteaceae, but have undivided leaves arranged alternately, sessile flowers arranged in loose groups in the axils of leaves or bracts, unlike those in the Banksia. Hakeas are similar to species of Grevillea but are distinguished from them in having persistent, woody fruits. (Those of grevilleas are not persistent and not woody. The upper and lower surfaces of the leaves of hakeas are similar (dissimilar in grevilleas), and the ovary and style are glabrous (but hairy in grevilleas).

Taxonomy and naming
The genus Hakea was first formally described in 1797 by Heinrich Schrader and Johann Christoph Wendland and the description was published in Sertum Hannoveranum. The genus is named after Baron Christian Ludwig von Hake, an 18th-century German patron of botany.

Distribution
Species of hakea are found in all states of Australia.

Horticulture
Hakeas are popular ornamental plants in gardens in Australia, and in many locations are as common as grevilleas and banksias. Several hybrids and cultivars have been developed, including Hakea 'Burrendong Beauty'. They are best grown in beds of light soil which are watered but still well drained.

Some showy western species, such as Hakea multilineata, H. francisiana and H. bucculenta, require grafting onto hardy stock such as Hakea salicifolia for growing in more humid climates, as they are sensitive to dieback.

Many species, particularly eastern Australian species, are notable for their hardiness, to the point they have become weedy. Hakea gibbosa, H. sericea, and H. drupacea (previously H. suaveolens) have been weeds in South Africa, Hakea laurina has become naturalized in the eastern states of Australia and is considered an environmental weed, and Hakea salicifolia, Hakea gibbosa, and Hakea sericea are invasive weeds in New Zealand.

List of species
The following is a list of Hakea species recognised by the Australian Plant Census, except for Hakea asperma which is recognised by the Royal Botanic Gardens Victoria:
 
 Hakea actites W.R.Barker – mulloway needlebush, wallum hakea
 Hakea aculeata A.S.George – column hakea
 Hakea acuminata Haegi
 Hakea adnata R.Br.
 Hakea aenigma W.R.Barker & Haegi – enigma hakea
 Hakea ambigua Meisn.
 Hakea amplexicaulis R.Br. – prickly hakea
 Hakea anadenia Haegi
 Hakea arborescens R.Br. – common hakea, yellow hakea
 Hakea archaeoides W.R.Barker
Hakea asperma Molyneux & Forrester – native dog hakea
 Hakea auriculata Meisn.
 Hakea bakeriana F.Muell. & Maiden
 Hakea baxteri R.Br. – fan hakea
 Hakea bicornata R.M.Barker
 Hakea brachyptera Meisn. – short-winged hakea
 Hakea brownii Meisn. – fan-leaf hakea
 Hakea bucculenta C.A.Gardner – red pokers
 Hakea candolleana Meisn.
 Hakea carinata F.Muell. ex Meisn.
 Hakea ceratophylla (Sm.) R.Br. – horned-leaf hakea, staghorn hakea
 Hakea chordophylla F.Muell. – bootlace oak, bootlace tree, corkwood, bull oak
 Hakea chromatropa A.S.George & R.M.Barker
 Hakea cinerea R.Br.
 Hakea circumalata Meisn.
 Hakea clavata Labill. – coastal hakea
 Hakea collina C.T.White
 Hakea commutata F.Muell.
 Hakea conchifolia Hook.f. – shell-leaved hakea
 Hakea constablei L.A.S.Johnson
 Hakea corymbosa R.Br. – cauliflower hakea
 Hakea costata Meisn. – ribbed hakea
 Hakea cristata R.Br.
 Hakea cucullata R.Br. – hood-leaved hakea, scallop hakea
 Hakea cyclocarpa Lindl. – ramshorn hakea
 Hakea cycloptera R.Br.
 Hakea cygna Lamont
 Hakea cygna Lamont subsp. cygna – swan-fruit hakea
 Hakea cygna subsp. needlei Lamont
 Hakea dactyloides Gaertn. – finger hakea
 Hakea decurrens R.Br.
 Hakea decurrens R.Br. subsp. decurrens
 Hakea decurrens subsp. physocarpa W.R.Barker
 Hakea decurrens subsp. platytaenia W.R.Barker
 Hakea denticulata R.Br. – stinking Roger
 Hakea divaricata L.A.S.Johnson – needlewood, corkbark tree, fork-leaved corkwood
 Hakea dohertyi Haegi
 Hakea drupacea (C.F.Gaertn.) Roem. & Schult.
 Hakea ednieana Tate – Flinders Range hakea, yandena
 Hakea elliptica (Sm.) R.Br. – oval-leaf hakea 
 Hakea eneabba Haegi
 Hakea epiglottis Labill.
 Hakea epiglottis Labill. subsp. epiglottis
 Hakea epiglottis subsp. milliganii (Meisn.) R.M.Barker
 Hakea erecta Lamont
 Hakea eriantha R.Br. – tree hakea
 Hakea erinacea Meisn. – hedgehog hakea, porcupine hakea
 Hakea eyreana (S.Moore) McGill – straggly corkbark
 Hakea falcata R.Br. – sickle hakea
 Hakea ferruginea Sweet
 Hakea flabellifolia Meisn. – fan-leaved hakea, wedge hakea
 Hakea florida R.Br.
 Hakea florulenta Meisn.
 Hakea francisiana F.Muell. – emu tree, grass-leaf hakea, bottlebrush hakea
 Hakea fraseri R.Br. – corkwood oak
 Hakea gibbosa (Sm.) Cav. – hairy hakea, rock hakea
 Hakea gilbertii Kippist
 Hakea grammatophylla (F.Muell.) F.Muell.
 Hakea hastata Haegi
 Hakea hookeriana Meisn. – Barren Range hakea
 Hakea horrida R.M.Barker
 Hakea ilicifolia R.Br.
 Hakea incrassata R.Br. – marble hakea
 Hakea invaginata B.L.Burtt
 Hakea ivoryi F.M.Bailey –  Ivory's hakea, corkwood, corkbark tree
 Hakea kippistiana Meisn.
 Hakea laevipes Gand.
 Hakea laevipes subsp. graniticola Haegi
 Hakea laevipes Gand. subsp. laevipes 
 Hakea lasiantha R.Br. – woolly-flowered hakea
 Hakea lasianthoides Rye
 Hakea lasiocarpha R.Br. – long-styled hakea
 Hakea laurina R.Br. – kodjet, pin-cushion hakea, emu bush
 Hakea lehmanniana Meisn. – blue hakea
 Hakea leucoptera R.Br. – silver needlewood, needle hakea, pin bush, water tree, booldoobah
 Hakea leucoptera R.Br. subsp. leucoptera
 Hakea leucoptera subsp. sericipes W.R.Barker
 Hakea linearis R.Br.
 Hakea lissocarpha R.Br. – honey bush, honeybush hakea
 Hakea lissosperma R.Br. – needle bush, mountain needlewood
 Hakea longiflora (Benth.) R.M.Barker
 Hakea loranthifolia Meisn.
 Hakea lorea (R.Br.) R.Br. – bootlace oak, cork tree
 Hakea lorea subsp. borealis W.R.Barker
 Hakea lorea (R.Br.) R.Br. subsp. lorea Hakea maconochieana Haegi
 Hakea macraeana F.Muell. – willow needlewood, Macrae's hakea
 Hakea macrocarpa A.Cunn. ex R.Br. – dogwood hakea
 Hakea macrorrhyncha W.R.Barker
 Hakea marginata R.Br.
 Hakea megadenia R.M.Barker
 Hakea megalosperma Meisn. – Lesueur hakea
 Hakea meisneriana Kippist
 Hakea microcarpa R.Br. – small-fruit hakea
 Hakea minyma Maconochie
 Hakea mitchellii Meisn.
 Hakea multilineata Meisn. – grass-leaf hakea
 Hakea myrtoides Meisn. – myrtle hakea
 Hakea neospathulata (formerly spathulata)
 Hakea neurophylla Meisn. – pink-flowered hakea
 Hakea newbeyana R.M.Barker
 Hakea nitida R.Br. – frog hakea, shining hakea
 Hakea nodosa R.Br. – yellow hakea
 Hakea obliqua R.Br. – needles and corks
 Hakea obliqua R.Br. subsp. obliqua Hakea obliqua subsp. parviflora R.M.Barker
 Hakea obtusa Meisn.
 Hakea ochroptera W.R.Barker
 Hakea oldfieldii Benth.
 Hakea oleifolia (Sm.) R.Br. – dungyn, olive-leaf hakea
 Hakea oligoneura K.A.Sheph. & R.M.Barker
 Hakea orthorrhyncha F.Muell. – bird beak hakea
 Hakea orthorrhyncha var. filiformis F.Muell. ex Benth.
 Hakea orthorrhyncha F.Muell. ex Benth. var. orthorrhyncha Hakea pachyphylla Sieber ex Spreng.
 Hakea pandanicarpa R.Br.
 Hakea pandanicarpa subsp. crassifolia (Meisn.) R.M.Barker
 Hakea pandanicarpaR.Br. subsp. pandanicarpa Hakea pedunculata F.Muell.
 Hakea pendens R.M.Barker
 Hakea persiehana F.Muell.
 Hakea petiolaris Meisn. – sea-urchin hakea
 Hakea petiolaris subsp. angusta Haegi
 Hakea petiolaris Meisn. subsp. petiolaris Hakea petiolaris subsp. trichophylla Haegi
 Hakea platysperma Hook. – cricket ball hakea, woody peach
 Hakea polyanthema Diels
 Hakea preissii Meisn. – needle tree, needle bush, Christmas hakea
 Hakea pritzelii Diels
 Hakea propinqua A.Cunn.
 Hakea prostrata R.Br. – harsh hakea
 Hakea psilorrhyncha R.M.Barker
 Hakea pulvinifera L.A.S.Johnson
 Hakea purpurea Hook.
 Hakea pycnoneura Meisn.
 Hakea recurva Meisn. – djarnokmurd
 Hakea recurva subsp. arida (Diels) W.R.Barker & R.M.Barker
 Hakea recurva Meisn. subsp. recurva Hakea repullulans H.M.Lee
 Hakea rhombales F.Muell. – walukara
 Hakea rigida C.A.Gardner ex Haegi
 Hakea rostrata F.Muell. ex Meisn.
 Hakea rugosa R.Br. – wrinkled hakea
 Hakea ruscifolia Labill. – candle hakea
 Hakea salicifolia (Vent.) B.L.Burtt – willow-leaved hakea
 Hakea salicifolia subsp. angustifolia (A.A.Ham.) W.R.Barker
 Hakea salicifolia (Vent.) B.L.Burtt subsp. salicifolia Hakea scoparia Meisn.
 Hakea scoparia Meisn. subsp. scoparia Hkea scoparia subsp. trycherica Haegi
 Hakea sericea Schrad. & J.C.Wendl. – needlebush, silky hakea
 Hakea smilacifolia Meisn.
 Hakea standleyensis Maconochie
 Hakea stenocarpa R.Br.
 Hakea stenophylla A.Cunn. ex R.Br.
 Hakea stenophylla subsp. notialis R.M.Barker
 Hakea stenophylla A.Cunn. ex R.Br. subsp. stenophylla
 Hakea strumosa Meisn.
 Hakea subsulcata Meisn.
 Hakea sulcata R.Br.
 Hakea tephrosperma R.Br. – hooked needlewood
 Hakea teretifolia (Salisb.) Britten – dagger hakea
 Hakea teretifolia subsp. hirsuta (Endl.) R.M.Barker
 Hakea teretifolia (Salisb.) Britten subsp. teretifolia
 Hakea trifurcata (Sm.) R.Br. – two-leaf, two-leaved hakea, kerosine bush
 Hakea trineura F.Muell. F.Muell.
 Hakea tuberculata R.Br.
 Hakea ulicina R.Br. - furze hakea (W.A.)
 Hakea undulata R.Br. – wavy-leaved hakea
 Hakea varia R.Br. –variable-leaved hakea
 Hakea verrucosa F.Muell.
 Hakea victoria J.Drumm. – lantern hakea, royal hakea
 Hakea vittata R.Br.

References

Further reading

External links

The Hakea Page: index Association of Societies for Growing Australian Plants

 
Proteaceae genera
Proteales of Australia
Endemic flora of Australia